The Alva Independent School District is a school district based in Alva, Oklahoma United States.

Facilities

Awards
In 2016 Washington Early Childcare Center was recognized with a national award by Let's Move Active Schools, part of First Lady Michelle Obama's Let's Move! initiative. The school was recognized for their 'outstanding efforts in creating an Active School environment'. To qualify for the award, schools must commit to providing students with at least 60 minutes of physical activity a day, and met benchmarks set by the program including; physical activity during school, physical education, physical activity before and after school, family and community engagement.

See also
List of school districts in Oklahoma

References

External links
 Alva Overview

School districts in Oklahoma
Education in Woods County, Oklahoma